Acroloxus lacustris, or the lake limpet, is a small freshwater limpet or snail, a species of aquatic gastropod mollusk in the family Acroloxidae.

Description
The 4–7 mm. (7 mm long, 3 mm wide and 2 mm high) shell is laterally compressed elongate and limpet-like (no whorls and cone or hat shaped) with a sharp apex twisted to the left The colour is yellowish-grey to brown. The dimensions may vary depending on the substrate surface. On thin plant stems the shells are narrow, and more parallel-sided on leaves and stones they are rather wide oval.

Distribution 
Found across Europe to western and central Siberia. The distribution type is Eurosiberian Wide Temperate. 
This species of freshwater limpet is found in European countries and islands including:
 Belgium
 Croatia
 Czech Republic
 Slovakia
 Poland
 Germany
 Netherlands
 Great Britain
 Ireland
For a full list see Fauna Europaea

Habitat
Acroloxus lacustris prefers still water. It lives in lakes, rivers, etc.

Conservation status

This species is listed as least concern by the IUCN red list.

It is thought to be extinct in Israel due to habitat loss.

References

External links
Acroloxus lacustris at Animalbase
Acroloxus lacustris images at  Consortium for the Barcode of Life
Encyclopedia of Life images

Acroloxidae
Gastropods described in 1758
Taxa named by Carl Linnaeus